Many Right to Information Act (RTI) activists, including policemen, have been harassed and even murdered for seeking information to "promote transparency and accountability in the working of every public authority" in India. Many face assaults on a regular basis. People seeking information from their gram panchayat and the local administration also face social ostracism. A few activists who sought information under RTI related to MNREGA scams, were killed. Many threats and attacks (including murder) go unreported by the media.

Media reports of more than 300 instances of attacks on or harassment of citizens and at least 51 murders and 5 suicides can be linked to information sought under The Right to Information Act. Maharashtra followed by Gujarat tops the list for states with the most attacks on RTI users.

Overview
RTI activists are vulnerable human rights defenders (HRDs) in India. Unlike other HRDs, a majority of the RTI activists are not part of an organisation; they often act alone, moved by anger at corruption and other illegal activities. RTI activists are vulnerable because they live in the same areas as public authorities and political leaders who do not want information about their activities to be disclosed. For the most part, human rights defenders receive media attention only when killed or seriously injured. When complaints are made by RTI activists, law enforcement personnel (who often work with corrupt officials) do not take appropriate action . The Right to Information Act, 2005 provides inadequate protection to whistleblowers. The Central Information Commission and the State Information Commissions are not mandated to deal with such threats or attacks or to provide protection when needed. Attacks on RTI users have not ceased despite directions from several information commissions and state governments to protect them from harm.

List of attacks
There are two sources of crowd sourced lists maintained of the attacks on people using RTI to seek transparency and accountability, primarily based on media reports. The first is via the National Campaign for People's Right to Information available here. The most recent update has 211 people harassed, 163 people physically harmed and an unfortunate 95 people murdered. The second maintained by CHRI is a Hall of Shame.

Killed/Murdered

Abducted/Kidnapped and Tortured

Assault

Harassment

Suicide

See also 
 The Right to Information Act 2005

References

Anti-corruption activism in India